is a popular Japanese fast food dish. It consists of a bowl of rice with stir-fried vegetables, onions, mushrooms, and thin slices of meat on top. Literally meaning "Chinese rice bowl", it is inspired by Chinese cuisine. It is a kind of donburi.

References 

Japanese Chinese cuisine
Japanese fusion cuisine
Japanese rice dishes